Chu River is the second largest river in Ningxiang and one of the largest tributaries of the Wei River.

Chu River's main tributaries include the Caochong River and Yanghua River. The river passes Qingshanqiao, Liushahe, Laoliangcang, and Hengshi, and empties into the Wei River in Hengshi.

References

Bibliography

Rivers of Changsha
Geography of Ningxiang